Frederick Marshall "Snake" Henry (July 19, 1895 – October 12, 1987) was a major league baseball first baseman and minor league manager.

He compiled a .187 batting average with four doubles, one triple, and seven runs batted in.

Henry's greatest achievements in baseball were in the minor leagues where he compiled 3384 career hits (fifth all time in minor league history), 675 doubles, and 200 triples (both ranking him second all time).

During that year, Henry physically attacked an umpire on the field after a close play at third. The assault included a knee to the groin, shoving and much swearing. It precipitated a near riot from the fans, and a one-year suspension for Henry.

Sources

 Kinston history page
 

1895 births
1987 deaths
People from Waynesville, North Carolina
Boston Braves players
Greensboro Patriots players
Suffolk Tigers players
Petersburg Goobers players
St. Joseph Drummers players
Hutchinson Wheatshockers players
Terre Haute Browns players
Milwaukee Brewers (AA) players
Columbus Senators players
San Antonio Bears players
New Orleans Pelicans (baseball) players
Omaha Buffaloes players
Omaha Crickets players
Montreal Royals players
Harrisburg Senators players
Norfolk Tars players
Toronto Maple Leafs (International League) players
Hartford Senators players
Portsmouth Truckers players
Portsmouth Cubs players
Tarboro Serpents players
Kinston Eagles players
Binghamton Triplets players
Houston Buffaloes players
Major League Baseball first basemen
Baseball players from North Carolina
Minor league baseball managers